Since Bangladesh women's first Women's One Day International (WODI) in 2011, 30 players have represented the team. A WODI is an international cricket match between two representative teams, each having WODI status, as determined by the International Cricket Council (ICC). An WODI differs from Test matches in that the number of overs per team is limited, and that each team has only one innings. The list is arranged in the order in which each player won her first ODI cap. Where more than one player won her first ODI cap in the same match, those players are listed alphabetically by surname.

Key

Players
Statistics are correct as on 17 December 2022.

See also
 List of Bangladesh women Twenty20 International cricketers

References

 
Bangladesh ODI
Cricket Women ODI
Cricketers